Joseph McCormick (29 October 1834 at Liverpool – 9 April 1914 at Westminster) was an English amateur cricketer who played first-class cricket from 1854 to 1866.

Joseph McCormick was educated at Bingley Grammar School and St John's College, Cambridge. A right-handed batsman and right arm slow roundarm bowler who was mainly associated with Cambridge University and Marylebone Cricket Club (MCC), he made 19 known appearances in first-class matches.  He claimed, while playing on Parker's Piece, to have hit a fast bowler to leg and run nine runs for it. In 1856, the year he captained Cambridge University at cricket, he was also a rowing blue. He played for the Gentlemen in the Gentlemen v Players series.  

In later life McCormick was a clergyman, Canon of York Cathedral from 1884 to 1901, and Hon. Chaplain to Victoria of the United Kingdom, King Edward VII and King George V.

Both of his sons, Pat and Gough, were clergyman, with Pat also being a noted sportsman. A memorial to him lies in St James's Church, Piccadilly.

References

External links
 CricketArchive profile

Further reading
 H S Altham, A History of Cricket, Volume 1 (to 1914), George Allen & Unwin, 1962
 Arthur Haygarth, Scores & Biographies, Volumes 1-11 (1744-1870), Lillywhite, 1862-72

English cricketers
English cricketers of 1826 to 1863
English cricketers of 1864 to 1889
Marylebone Cricket Club cricketers
Cambridge University cricketers
Gentlemen cricketers
1834 births
1914 deaths
I Zingari cricketers
Alumni of St John's College, Cambridge
People educated at Bingley Grammar School
Gentlemen of Marylebone Cricket Club cricketers
North of the Thames v South of the Thames cricketers